is a Japanese actress, voice actress and narrator from Bunkyō, Tokyo. She is affiliated with Aoni Production.

In 2012, Minaguchi took a nineteen-month-long hiatus from acting in order to study abroad in the United States. This resulted in Shino Kakinuma being cast as Videl for the final arc of Dragon Ball Kai, although Minaguchi did reprise her role as the character for 2013's theatrical film Dragon Ball Z: Battle of Gods and continued to voice her afterwards.

Filmography

Television animation
1980s
Bosco Adventure (1986) (Princess Apricot)
Kamen no Ninja Akakage (1987) (Akane)
Sally the Witch (1989) (Nancy)
YAWARA! a fashionable judo girl! (1989) (Yawara Inokuma and Kaneko Inokuma)
Jushin Liger (1989) (Yuki)
1990s
The Laughing Salesman (1990) (Reiko)
Here is Greenwood (1991) (Misako)
Yadamon (1992) (Kira)
Dragon Ball Z (1993) (Videl and Pan)
Sailor Moon S (1994) (Hotaru Tomoe (Sailor Saturn), Mistress 9, Girl)
Sailor Moon Sailor Stars (1996) (Hotaru Tomoe (Sailor Saturn))
Dragon Ball GT (1996) (Pan and Videl)
Dr. Slump (Remake) (1997) (Midori Yamabuki)
Flame of Recca (1997) (Menō Sakura)
Cardcaptor Sakura (1998) (Nadeshiko Kinomoto)
Reign: The Conqueror (1999) (Roxanne)
Betterman (1999) (Kaede)
2000s
UFO Baby (2000) (Miki Kozuki)
Saiyuki (2000) (Yaone)
Final Fantasy: Unlimited (2001) (Marie Hayakawa)
A Little Snow Fairy Sugar (2001) (Saga's mother)
Kanon (2002) (Akiko Minase)
Inuyasha (2003) (Koyuki)
Final Approach (2004) (Yurika Menou)
Fushigiboshi no Futagohime (2005) (Princess Grace)
Onegai My Melody (2006) (Kuromi's Mother)
Hayate the Combat Butler (2007) (Yukariko Sanzenin)
Clannad (2007) (Kōko Ibuki)
MapleStory (2007) (Kino)
Princess Resurrection (2007) (Sawawa Hiyorimi)
Casshern Sins (2008) (Ringo)
Yes! Precure 5 GoGo! (2008) (Flora)
Rosario + Vampire Capu2 (2008) (Tsurara Shirayuki)
Detective Conan (2009) (Mina Eguchi)
2010s
One Piece (2010) (Portgas D. Rouge)
Sket Dance (2011) (Omi Aiko)
Is This a Zombie? (2011) (Delusion Eucliwood #4)
Place to Place (2012) (Miiko Inui)
Sword Art Online II (2014) (Freyja)
Hokuto no Ken: Ichigo Aji (2015) (Yuria)
Dragon Ball Super (2015) (Videl and Pan)
Is the Order a Rabbit? (2015) (Cocoa's Mother)
The Case Files of Lord El-Melloi II: Rail Zeppelin Grace Note (2019) (Hishiri Adashino)
Demon Slayer: Kimetsu no Yaiba (2019) (Rei Kibutsuji)
2020s
Bofuri (2020) (Mizari)
Skeleton Knight in Another World (2022) (Glenys)

Original video animation (OVA)
Blue Sonnet (1989) (Yumi)
Final Fantasy: Legend of the Crystals (1994) (Linaly)
Golden Boy (1995) (Naoko Katsuda)
Bio Hunter (1995) (Sayaka)
Otogi-Jūshi Akazukin (2005) (Sayo Suzukaze)

Theatrical animation
Doraemon: Nobita and the Tin Labyrinth (1993) (Sapio)
Dragon Ball Z: Broly – Second Coming (1994) (Videl)
Dragon Ball Z: Fusion Reborn (1995) (Videl)
Dragon Ball Z: Wrath of the Dragon (1995) (Videl)
X (1996) (Hinoto)
Neighborhood Story (1996) (Ayumi Oikawa)
Yes! Precure 5: Great Miraculous Adventure in the Mirror Kingdom! (2007) (Dark Mint)
Clannad (2007) (Kouko Ibuki)
Dragon Ball Z: Battle of Gods (2013) (Videl)
Dragon Ball Z: Resurrection 'F' (2015) (Videl)
Detective Conan: Sunflowers of Inferno (2015) (Umeno (Flashback))
Yo-kai Watch Shadowside: Oni-ō no Fukkatsu (2017) (Neko-Musume)
Dragon Ball Super: Super Hero (2022) (Videl, Pan)

Video games
Langrisser I (1993) (Chris)
Pretty Soldier Sailor Moon: Another Story (1995) (Hotaru Tomoe/Sailor Saturn)
BS Tantei Club: Yuki ni Kieta Kako (1997) (Ayumi Tachibana)
Ehrgeiz (1998) (Tifa Lockhart)
Gunbird 2 (1998) (Tavia)
Mitsumete Knight (1998) (Sara Pixis)
Langrisser V: The End of Legend (1998) (Lambda)
Gundam Side Story 0079: Rise from the Ashes (1999) (Jacqueline)
Super Robot Wars series (1999–) (Xenia Grania Bilseia, Monica Grania Bilseia)
Sonic Shuffle (2000) (Illumina)
Tales of Eternia (2001) (Farah Oersted)
Tales of Symphonia (2003) (Farah Oersted)
The Legend of Heroes series (2004–) (Klose Rinz)
Crimson Tears (2004) (Shizuka)
Dragon Ball series (2004–) (Videl, Pan)
Tokimeki Memorial Girl's Side: 2nd Kiss (2007) (Mizushima Hisoka)
Klonoa: Door to Phantomile (Wii) (2008) (Lephise)
Clannad Full Voice (2008) (Kouko Ibuki)
Ninja Gaiden series (2008–) (Momiji)
Loveplus (2009–) (Nene Anegasaki)
Warriors Orochi 3 Hyper (2012) (Momiji)
Dead or Alive 5 Ultimate (2013) (Momiji)
Granblue Fantasy (2014–) (Sorn/Tweyen)
Warriors Orochi 3 Ultimate (2014) (Momiji)
Dead or Alive Xtreme 3 (2016) (Momiji)
Phantasy Star Online 2 Episode 4 (2016) (Phaleg Ives)
Dead or Alive 6 (2019) (Momiji)
Famicom Detective Club: The Missing Heir and The Girl Who Stands Behind  (2021) (Ayumi Tachibana)
Monochrome Mobius: Rights and Wrongs Forgotten (2022) (Shunya)
Dragon Quest Treasures (2022) (Princess Anemone, Monsters)

Dubbing

Live-action
Babe: Pig in the City (2002 NTV edition) (Zootie)
Dungeons & Dragons (Empress Savina (Thora Birch))
The Virgin Suicides (Lux Lisbon (Kirsten Dunst))

Animation
Hello Kitty's Furry Tale Theater (Catnip)
Topo Gigio (2003) (Rosie)
Pokémon the Movie: Genesect and the Legend Awakened (2013) (Chill Drive Genesect) (English dub)

References

External links
 

1966 births
Living people
Aoni Production voice actors
Japanese stage actresses
Japanese video game actresses
Japanese voice actresses
People from Bunkyō
Voice actresses from Tokyo
20th-century Japanese actresses
21st-century Japanese actresses